The Wuppertal tramway network served Wuppertal, Germany for 114 years until its closure in 1987.

History
The first horse-drawn tram line opened between what were then the twin cities of  Barmen and Elberfeld in 1873. The network was expanded and electrified with overhead wires starting in 1896. The tram network was operated by a number of companies and starting in 1901 had to compete with the Wuppertal Suspension Railway for passengers travelling east-west through the region. In 1925 Barmen and Elberfeld merged to form the city of Wuppertal and in 1940 the numerous tram operators were consolidated into a single system.

After the introduction of public buses, tram lines in Wuppertal were gradually discontinued until the entire system was closed on May 30, 1987.

Routes

In its last decade in operation, the Wuppertal tram network consisted of 5 tram lines as outlined below.

References

Tram transport in Germany
Wuppertal
1873 establishments in Germany
1987 disestablishments in Germany